Bexhill and Battle is a constituency in East Sussex represented in the House of Commons of the UK Parliament since 2015 by Huw Merriman of the Conservative Party.

Constituency profile 
The constituency is predominantly rural, like Wealden to the west. The main towns are the shingle-beach resort of Bexhill-on-Sea and the historic town of Battle. Electoral Calculus describes the seat as "Strong Right" characterised by retired, socially conservative voters who strongly supported Brexit.

Notable representative
The seat's first MP, Charles Wardle, served as a junior Home Office minister in the government of John Major; Wardle had the Conservative whip removed shortly before the 2001 general election. The seat was held by Gregory Barker from 2001 until 2015; Barker was a junior minister at the Department for Energy and Climate Change between the formation of the Conservative-Liberal Democrat coalition after the 2010 general election and the major government reshuffle of July 2014, when he resigned and announced his intention to retire from Parliament at the next general election.

Political history
At the 2015 general election, Huw Merriman was elected, and was re-elected in the 2017 general election.  The closest it came to a non-Conservative victory was in 2001, when Barker, in the first of his three successful campaigns, was returned by a margin of 10,503 votes.

In June 2016, an estimated 57.7% of local adults voting in the EU membership referendum chose to leave the European Union instead of to remain. This was matched in two January 2018 votes in Parliament by its MP.

Boundaries 

1983–2010: The District of Rother wards of Ashburnham, Battle, Beckley and Peasmarsh, Bodiam and Ewhurst, Brede and Udimore, Burwash, Catsfield and Crowhurst, Central, Collington, Etchingham and Hurst Green, Northiam, Old Town, Sackville, St Mark's, St Michael's, St Stephen's, Salehurst, Sedlescombe and Whatlington, Sidley, Ticehurst, and Westfield, and the District of Wealden wards of Herstmonceux, Ninfield, and Pevensey and Westham.

2010–present: The District of Rother wards of Battle Town, Central, Collington, Crowhurst, Darwell, Ewhurst and Sedlescombe, Kewhurst, Old Town, Rother Levels, Sackville, St Mark's, St Michael's, St Stephen's, Salehurst, Sidley, and Ticehurst and Etchingham, and the District of Wealden wards of Cross In Hand/Five Ashes, Heathfield East, Heathfield North and Central, Herstmonceux, Ninfield and Hooe with Wartling, and Pevensey and Westham.

The seat almost matches the district of Rother in East Sussex.

Members of Parliament

Elections

Elections in the 2010s

This constituency underwent boundary changes between the 2005 and 2010 general elections and thus change in share of vote is based on a notional calculation.

Elections in the 2000s

Elections in the 1990s

Elections in the 1980s

See also
List of parliamentary constituencies in East Sussex

Notes

References

Sources
Election result, 2005 (BBC)
Election results, 1997 – 2001 (BBC)
Election results, 1997 – 2001  (Election Demon)
Election results, 1983 – 1992 (Election Demon) (Result is incorrect for 1992)
Election results, 1992 – 2005 (Guardian)

Parliamentary constituencies in South East England
Constituencies of the Parliament of the United Kingdom established in 1983
Politics of East Sussex
Rother District
Battle, East Sussex